Williams v. Pennsylvania, 579 U.S. ___ (2016), was a United States Supreme Court case in which the Court held that a prosecutor involved in seeking the death penalty for a defendant should recuse himself if asked to judge an appeal in the capital case.

Background 
Terrance Williams was convicted and sentenced to death for the murder and robbery of Amos Norwood and then appealed to the Supreme Court of Pennsylvania.   The Chief Justice of the state court by that point was Ronald Castille, who had been the local District Attorney of Philadelphia throughout Williams’ trial, sentencing, and appeal, and who had personally authorized his office to seek the death penalty in this case. The attorneys for Williams asked the justice to recuse himself but Castille refused.

Opinion of the Court 
Associate Justice Anthony Kennedy authored the majority opinion.

References

External links
 
 SCOTUSblog coverage

United States Supreme Court cases
United States Supreme Court cases of the Roberts Court
2016 in United States case law
Conflict of interest mitigation
Supreme Court of Pennsylvania
United States death penalty case law
Capital punishment in Pennsylvania
Crime in Philadelphia